Al-Azhar University – Gaza, often abbreviated AUG, is a Palestinian, public, non-profit, and independent higher education institution. During the first intifada, Palestinian Leader Yasser Arafat issued a decree in September 1991 to establish a Palestinian national university. AUG opened its journey on 18 October 1991 in a two-story building with 725 students enrolled in two faculties; the Faculty of Education and the Faculty of Sharia and Law (now the Faculty of Law). Like most educational institutes in Gaza, the university is gender-segregated.

History 
AUG opened its doors in 1991 with only two faculties: the Faculty of Education and the Faculty of Sharia and Law (now the Faculty of Law). In 1992, four faculties: the Faculty of Pharmacy, the Faculty of Agriculture and Environment, the Faculty of Science, and the Faculty of Arts & Human Sciences were established, followed by the Faculty of Economics and Administrative Sciences.

The Faculty of Applied Medical Sciences was established at another stage of AUG development in 1997 to fulfill the medical needs of the Palestinian community. In 1999, the Faculty of Medicine, a branch of the Palestinian Faculty of Medicine in Al-Quds University-Abu Dis, was opened as the first medical faculty in the Gaza Strip.

The Faculty of Engineering and Information Technology was launched in 2001 to keep abreast of new knowledge and technology. In 2007, the Faculty of Dentistry was opened to improve the oral health care of the Palestinian community. The Faculty of Sharia was reopened as a distinct faculty in 2009.

In 2015, King Hassan II for Environmental Sciences and Agriculture Building was inaugurated on the new campus in the Al-Mughraqa area. The construction of this building was funded by King Mohammed VI of Morocco. Two buildings, the auditorium and the Faculty of Arts and Human Sciences were funded by the Saudi Fund for Development and will be annexed to the new campus in Al-Mughraqa.

Faculties
 Faculty of Agriculture and Environment
 Faculty of Applied Medical Sciences
 Faculty of Arts and Human Sciences
 Faculty of Dentistry
 Faculty of Economics and Administrative Sciences
 Faculty of Engineering and Information Technology
 Faculty of Education
 Faculty of Law
 Faculty of Medicine
 Faculty of Pharmacy
 Faculty of Science
 Faculty of Sharia

See also
 List of Palestinian universities
 Education in the Palestinian territories

References

Bibliography
Bowen, Donna Lee, and Early, Evelyn A. (2002). Everyday Life in the Muslim Middle East: Second Edition. Indiana University Press.

External links

 
Educational institutions established in 1991
1991 establishments in the Palestinian territories
Buildings and structures in Gaza City